Ora Ito (born 1977 in Marseille, France) is a French designer.  'Ora-Ïto' is the brand name of his work and includes designs for watchmaker Swatch, appliance manufacturer Gorenje, brewer Heineken and tobacconist/fragrance chemist Davidoff.

The underlying philosophy behind his design work is Simplexity, and his design language can be described as minimal with organic techno-futuristic elements.

References

External links
Die Karriere von Ora Ito 

1977 births
French designers
French industrial designers
Living people
Date of birth missing (living people)
French people of Italian descent
Businesspeople from Marseille